Letha (Hellen Feliciano) is a supervillain appearing in American comic books published by Marvel Comics. The character has been depicted as a former member of the female villain team the Grapplers.

Publication history
Letha first appeared in Marvel Two-in-One #54 (Aug. 1979), and was created by Mark Gruenwald and Ralph Macchio.

The character subsequently appeared in Marvel Two-in-One #56-57 (Oct.–Nov. 1979), Dazzler #13 (March 1982), Marvel Two-in-One #96 (Feb. 1983), and The Thing #33 (March 1986). She was killed by the Scourge of the Underworld in Captain America #319 (July 1986).

Letha received an entry in The Official Handbook of the Marvel Universe Deluxe Edition #18.

Fictional character biography
Hellen Feliciano was a protégée of Auntie Freeze and a founding member of the Grapplers, along with Titania, Poundcakes, and Screaming Mimi. She, like the other Grapplers, was a female wrestler recruited by Roxxon Oil to break into Project Pegasus, but were stopped and served time in prison. In prison, they battled Dazzler to avenge Klaw's death, though they were defeated after she reflected Screaming Mimi's voice back at them.  Letha's strength was boosted by the Power Broker, and she and her cohorts joined the Unlimited Class Wrestling Federation.

While planning to avenge the death of Titania at the hands of the Scourge of the Underworld, Letha was among the eighteen villains killed at the "Bar With No Name" by the Scourge disguised as a bartender.

Letha was later among the seventeen criminals, all murdered by the Scourge, to be resurrected by Hood using the power of Dormammu as part of a squad assembled to eliminate the Punisher. She can now affect an opponent's aggression, causing the victim to go berserk with rage. She demonstrates these her powers by making Cyclone savagely beat Mind-Wave. Letha and Lascivious encounter Mind-Wave (who had been posing as Iron Man) and end up surviving a grenade explosion that kills Mind-Wave. Letha later removes another grenade from Mirage's mouth. Upon learning that Cyclone and Miracle Man bailed, Letha has Microchip warn them to return or she will kill their living loved ones. She and Lascivious later assist Human Fly into attacking the Punisher. She battled the Punisher again and is defeated when he causes her to drop a bus on herself.

Although Letha and Lascivious failed their mission to kill the Punisher, the Hood allowed the pair to live. They re-formed the Grapplers with Poundcakes and a new Screaming Mimi in order to lure out the original Mimi, who had become a superhero named Songbird. The Grapplers were eventually defeated and taken into custody, with the new Screaming Mimi leaving a life of crime. Letha later appeared as a member of Max Fury's Masters of Evil stationed in Bagalia. At some point, Letha befriended the second Titania, Mary MacPherran, and joined her and Poundcakes on an outing to a bar to meet Absorbing Man, Beast. and Wonder Man.

After Jack Flag was betrayed by Captain America, who had been revealed as a HYDRA agent, Letha joined Lascivious and Crossfire in nearly robbing the unconscious hero. However, Sharon Carter and Free Spirit were able to convince the villains to leave the scene.

Letha was next seen working with Poundcakes as they extorted money from various business owners in New York City. Letha discovered the Avengers' butler Edwin Jarvis while waiting for Poundcakes during a mission. This led to a battle with the brand new Wasp, Nadia Pym. Nadia managed to defeat both Letha and Poundcakes, and the pair was presumably incarcerated. The pair would later be hired by Nadia into her organization Geniuses in action Research Labs (G.I.R.L.), as she thought they could be redeemed for their past crimes.

While working as a security officer for G.I.R.L., Letha and Poundcakes continued to pursue a legitimate career in professional wrestling. The duo branded themselves as the Skrull Kill Krew. After one of their matches, Letha and the rest of G.I.R.L. returned to Pym Labs to find it under attack from A.I.M. Letha and Poundcakes were sent to find Nadia's friend Ying.

Powers and abilities
Letha was a superb wrestler and hand-to-hand combatant who was known for her highly acrobatic style of fighting. She has superhuman strength (2 tons) following treatment from Power Broker. Letha carried a variety of weapons within her special leather belts and straps. She also carried a rope for help in scaling walls.

After her resurrection by The Hood, Letha gained the ability to tap into the part of the brain that regulates aggression. She is able to make her opponents go berserk with murderous rage. She is able to target many individuals at once, such as when she forced a room full of veterans to kill each other in order to get the Punisher's attention.

Other versions

Marvel Zombies
A zombified version of Letha appeared in the Marvel Zombies universe as an inhabitant of the Deadlands.

References

External links

Characters created by Mark Gruenwald
Characters created by Ralph Macchio
Comics characters introduced in 1979
Fictional professional wrestlers
Marvel Comics characters with superhuman strength
Marvel Comics female supervillains
Marvel Comics martial artists
Marvel Comics mutates